El Aserradero (meaning The Sawmill) is a log flume located in the Spain section at Six Flags Over Texas in Arlington, Texas, since 1963.

History
'El Aserradero' was the first ever log flume attraction in the world and the fourth oldest ride currently operating at the park, built by Arrow Development, which later became Arrow Dynamics. The log flume replaced the 'Burro Ride', which operated from 1961 to 1962. From 1963 to 1968, El Aserradero only operated one flume. Then in 1968, due to the ride's popularity, Six Flags added a second flume to next to the original doubling the capacity of the attraction. The park billed the ride as "the most popular and exciting ride ever devised."

During the 1970s, Six Flags Over Texas added themed animations along the ride in which Lumberjacks could be seen sawing logs. Also added was a cover to the drop on flume 2, which later was removed along with the animations.

El Aserradero's success inspired many amusement parks around the world to add a log flume of some type.

Ride Experience

El Aserradero's entrance is located in the Texas theme section of the park, but the ride is in the Spain section along with the exit. Once guests load into one of the fiberglass logs, the log then travels to the first lift hill. The log is carried up the lift hill on a conveyor belt, then drops down a slide into the flume, which is the highest part of the ride. The log then floats around the curving flume, carried forward by the water and traveling slightly downhill. The log then reaches a second lift hill, then drops down a much longer slide and splashes down at the end of the ride.

El Aserradero operates from spring to the end of Fright Fest in October.

See also
 Log Flume

Primary sources

Park Times, El Aserradero full of information of El Aserradero

Amusement rides introduced in 1963
Six Flags Over Texas
Water rides
Water rides manufactured by Arrow Dynamics
Six Flags attractions